Rosa 'Duchess of Cornwall' is an orange blend rose cultivar bred by Hans Jürgen Evers from Rosen Tantau in Germany and introduced in 2005. The nostalgic hybrid tea rose is known as  'Music Hall' in France, and as  'Chippendale' in Germany. According to Robert Markley, it is already one of Tantau's most successful roses.

Naming 
The name 'Duchess of Cornwall' was chosen in the UK in honour of Camilla Parker Bowles to celebrate her wedding to the Prince of Wales, after which she assumed the title Duchess of Cornwall. She received it during a tour at BBC Gardeners' World Live at the National Exhibition Centre (NEC) in Birmingham in June 2005.

The German cultivar name 'Chippendale' alludes to the ornate English Rococo style called Chippendale.

Description 
The rose is described as a very double apricot flower. It has an old fashioned, quartered bloom form with up to 100 petals, and a light, spicy fragrance. The colour is weather dependent, reaching from deep orange to soft pink.

Tantau recommends the plantation in small groups, but the shrub can also be grown solitary or in containers.

Awards 
In 2012, it was granted the Award of Garden Merit by the Royal Horticultural Society. At the rose show in the Rosarium Uetersen in 2013, the cultivar won a bronze medal in the category Most Beautiful Rose.

References

Camilla, Queen Consort
Duchess of Cornwall
2005 introductions